El Consorcio is a Spanish singing group from Bilbao, formed in 1993 by singers Amaya, Estíbaliz and Iñaki Uranga, Carlos Zubiaga and Sergio Blanco, all of them past members of the singing group Mocedades. In 2016 they received the Latin Grammy Lifetime Achievement Award.

Discography

Studio albums 
 Lo que nunca muere (1994)
 Peticiones del oyente (1995)
 Programa doble (1996)
 Cuba (1998)
 Las canciones de mi vida (2000)
 De ida y vuelta (2005)
 Querido Juan (2008)
 Noche de ronda (2012)

Compilation albums
 El Consorcio (1996)
 Grandes éxitos (1997)
 Cachito mío (2001)
 Los diez de El Consorcio (2002)
 Lo mejor (2003)
 El Consorcio (2006)
 Canciones para toda la vida (2007)
 De Mocedades a El Consorcio. 40 años de música (2010)
 Grandes intérpretes (2012)
 El Consorcio grandes éxitos 1993-2015 (2016)
 Eres Tú. Más de 50 grandes éxitos. 3 CDs + DVD (2017)

Live Albums 
 En vivo desde el corazón de México (2003)

References 

1993 establishments in Spain
Musical groups established in 1993
Basque music bands
Spanish musical groups
Latin Grammy Lifetime Achievement Award winners